Neo-Chalcedonism (also neo-Chalcedonianism) was a sixth-century theological movement in the Byzantine empire. The term however is quite recent, first appearing in a 1909 work by J. Lebon.

Overview
The main preoccupation of neo-Chalcedonians was specifying the nature of the hypostatic union of two natures in Christ, which was left vague in the definition of Chalcedon. The dyophysite neo-chaldeconians were chiefly opposed by the monophysites, who increasingly labelled them Nestorians, that is, deniers of the deity of Christ.

Major neo-Chalcedonians include Nephalios, John of Caesarea and Leontios of Jerusalem. They sought a middle ground with the so-called "verbal" (moderate) monophysites. They emphasised the synthesis of natures in Christ, employing a word favoured by the verbal monophysites, and the hypostatic as opposed to natural union of the natures. They continued to accept the proposition that only "one of the Trinity has suffered" and the twelve anathemas of Cyril of Alexandria.

The movement achieved supremacy in Egypt during the pontificates of Anastasius I (559–69, 593–99) and Gregory (569–93) of Antioch. Emperor Justinian I accepted the neo-Chalcedonian interpretation, and it was approved officially at the Second Council of Constantinople in 553. This provoked the Schism of the Three Chapters, which lasted over a century.

References

Further reading
Allen, Pauline. "Neo-Chalcedonism and the Patriarchs of the Late Sixth Century". Byzantion 50 (1980): 5–17.
Gray, P. "Neo-Chalcedonianism and the Tradition: From Patristic to Byzantine Theology". Byzantinische Forschungen 8 (1982): 61–70.
Helmer, S. Der Neuchalkedonismus. Bonn, 1962.
Lebon, J. "Le monophysisme sevérien". Louvain, 1909.
Moeller, C. "Un représentant de la christologie néochalcédonienne au début du VIe siècle en Orient: Nephalius d'Alexandrie". Revue d'histoire ecclésiastique 40 (1944–45): 73–140.
Moeller, C.  "Le chalcédonisme et le néo-chalcédonisme en Orient de 451 à la fin du VIe siècle". Das Konzil von Chalkedon, vol. 1 (Würzburg, 1951): 666–96.
 
 

Christianity in the Byzantine Empire
Nature of Jesus Christ